Ralph Trenewith (died 1427), of Fentongollan in St Michael Penkivel and Trenowth in St. Probus, Cornwall, was an English Member of Parliament in 1395 for Liskeard.

References

14th-century births
1427 deaths
People from Cornwall
15th-century English people
English MPs 1395